1998–99 Second League of FR Yugoslavia consisted of two groups of 18 teams.

League table

East

West

Yugoslav Second League seasons
Yugo
2